Glimpse Glacier is an alpine glacier composed of two segments, separated by an icefall, which flow northeast from the névé in the area between Mount Kempe and Mount Huggins, Antarctica. It was so named by the Victoria University of Wellington Antarctic Expedition, 1960–61, because it was up this glacier that the geologists traversed to the Koettlitz–Skelton divide at the ridge crest in order to gain their only glimpse of the polar plateau in January 1961.

References

Glaciers of Victoria Land
Scott Coast